The Good Pub Guide is a long-running critical publication which lists and rates public houses (pubs) in the United Kingdom.

Published by Random House's Ebury Publishing subsidiary since 1982, it is released annually in book form and, since 2009, online.

By 2009, the book form guide contained over 5,000 of pubs based upon food, drink, and atmosphere. There were 1,140 fully inspected main entries and 1,931 entries recommended by readers which had yet to be inspected. In addition, the website contained a list of 55,000 pubs.

Guide categorisations

Pubs receive a categorisation according to the findings of a GPG inspection. In order of the highest rating first, they are:

 Approved:  a pub which has been fully inspected by GPG staff and has attained the highest standard.
 Recommended:  a pub which has been fully inspected by GPG staff and has attained a high standard.
 Lucky Dip: a pub which has been recommended for inclusion by several readers, but has not yet been assessed by GPG staff.

See also
 List of public house topics
 The Good Food Guide (1949-present)

References

External links
The Good Pub Guide

Hospitality industry in the United Kingdom
Publications established in 1982
Pubs in the United Kingdom
Restaurant guides
Travel guide books
1982 establishments in the United Kingdom